James Williamson may refer to:

Born before 1900
 James Williamson (priest), Church of England, Archdeacon of Lewes (1723 to 1736)
 James Williamson (New South Wales politician) (1811–1881), pastoralist and member of the New South Wales Legislative Council, and later, Assembly
 James Williamson (New Zealand politician) (1814–1888), New Zealand politician
 James Alexander Williamson (1829–1902), Union general in the American Civil War
 James Williamson (Victorian politician) (1831–1914),  member of the Victorian Legislative Council (Australia)
 James Williamson, 1st Baron Ashton (1842–1930), British businessman and Liberal Party politician
 J. C. Williamson (James Cassius Williamson, 1845–1913),  American  actor and later theatrical manager in Australia
 James Williamson (film pioneer) (1855–1933), Scottish film-pioneer
 James Williamson (historian) (1886–1964), English historian of maritime exploration
 James DeLong Williamson (1849–1935), American minister and president of Western Reserve University
 James Williamson (mathematician) (1725–1795), Scottish minister and mathematician, joint founder of Royal Society of Edinburgh

Born after 1900
 James Williamson (musician) (born 1949), American guitarist, songwriter and record producer, guitarist with The Stooges
 James Allen Williamson (born 1951), Oklahoma state senator
 James Williamson (Australian cyclist) (1983–2010), Australian journalist and cyclist
 James Williamson (New Zealand cyclist) (born 1989), New Zealand cyclist
 James F. Williamson (fl. from c. 2000), American architect and author
 Jimmie Williamson, American community college leader
 Jimmy Williamson (1928–2015), Scottish footballer